Şükrü Uzuner (born 2 February 1969) is a Turkish former footballer who is last known to have played as a forward for FC Blackbird.

Career

Uzuner started his career with Turkish second tier side Kartalspor. In 1992, he was sent on loan to Darıca Gençlerbirliği in the Turkish fourth tier. In 1994, Uzuner signed for Finnish fourth tier club Huima. In 1995, he signed for JJK in the Finnish third tier, helping them earn promotion to the Finnish second tier. Before the 1998 season, Uzuner signed for Finnish top flight team FinnPa, where he made 24 league appearances and scored 9 goals. Before the 1999 season, he signed for HJK in the Finnish top flight. 

Before the 2000 season, Uzuner signed for Finnish second tier outfit Atlantis FC, helping them earn promotion to the Finnish top flight. Before the 2002 season, he signed for JJK in the Finnish third tier. In 2009, Uzuner was sent on loan to Finnish fourth tier side BET, where he was suspended for a month due to walking off the field after getting a red card before going back to the field and head butting the opponent he fouled.

References

External links

 

Turkish footballers
Kolmonen players
Kakkonen players
Association football forwards
Living people
1969 births
Turkish expatriate sportspeople in Finland
Veikkausliiga players
Expatriate footballers in Finland
Atlantis FC players
Helsingin Jalkapalloklubi players
Kartalspor footballers
FinnPa players
FC Hämeenlinna players
JJK Jyväskylä players
Darıca Gençlerbirliği footballers
Maltepespor footballers
Kotkan Työväen Palloilijat players
3. Liga players
Footballers from Istanbul
Turkish expatriate footballers